Gloria Jacqueline LeRoy (November 7, 1925 – May 24, 2018) was an American character actress. She had a diverse career on stage, in film, and on television. Her film career began after Norman Lear spotted her on stage and cast her in The Night They Raided Minsky's in 1968. She was perhaps best known for playing the voluptuous Mildred "Boom Boom" Turner in the 1970s sitcom All in the Family.

Biography
LeRoy was born in 1925 to vaudeville performers Loletta and Russell LeRoy in Bucyrus, Ohio. When she was a young girl the family moved to New York, where they owned a dance school, which both Gloria and her brother Kenneth studied. Kenneth went on to star on Broadway as a dancer and singer and was the first Bernardo in West Side Story. Gloria performed on Broadway in Artists and Models with Jackie Gleason in 1943 at age 17 as a Specialty Dancer. Her early career started in night clubs as a dancer and singer for Barbara Walters' father, impresario Lou Walters, at the Latin Quarter. She later headlined Nouvelle Eve, a Parisian cabaret show import, at the Hotel El Rancho Vegas from 1951 to 1952.

She was cast in a production of Hello, Dolly! (1964) as Ernestina Money, but was replaced by Mary Jo Catlett. She toured with Ann Corio's This Was Burlesque as a tassel-twirler. She also appeared in George M! A New Musical.

She had recurring roles on the soaps Days of Our Lives as Queenie (1989), The Young and the Restless as Beatrice Tucker (1998) and Passions as Ruth (2000). She appeared in Three's Company as Nancy in the episode "The Goodbye Guy" (1980), as well as on Married... with Children as Chesty LaRue in the episode "Live Nude Peg" (1997). In 2001, she appeared in the season 8 Frasier episode "A Day in May" as Mrs. Smolenski, a prospective house buyer. In 2007, LeRoy appeared in the pilot episode of Rules of Engagement. In 2009, she appeared in Season 5 of Desperate Housewives as Rose Kemper. She also appeared in season 1 and season 2 episodes of the Showtime series Shameless as Aunt Ginger. Her final appearances were in season 3 episodes of the HBO series Getting On in 2015.

LeRoy died in Los Angeles, California on May 24, 2018 at age 92.

Filmography

Film

Television

References

External links
 

1925 births
2018 deaths
American television actresses
American film actresses
American stage actresses
Actresses from New York (state)
People from Bucyrus, Ohio
People from the Bronx
21st-century American women